Pestrý týden was a Czech illustrated weekly magazine published November 2, 1926 to April 28, 1945, during the First and Second Czechoslovak Republics and during the Protectorate of Bohemia and Moravia. It helped establish top photo-reporters of the 1930s, such as Karel Hájek, Václav Jírů and Ladislav Sitenský. Published and printed by  Grafické závody ('Graphic Works') by Václav Neubert and Sons, based in Smíchov, Prague it was issued in 963 numbers.

Establishment 

Pestrý týden was founded by Karel Neubert, who managed it until its demise in 1945. In English, the title may be translated as ‘Colourful’, 'Variegated' or ‘Prismatic’ Week.

The editorial circle in the first years consisted of: journalist Milena Jesenská, graphic artist Vratislav Hugo Brunner, painter, poet and founding member of Devětsil Adolf Hoffmeister, and publisher Karel Neubert. This group of editors sought to create an intellectual magazine. At the end of the 1920s, this editorial office was replaced by a group around Jaromír Johna, under whom it was transformed from an élite revue into a pictorial family weekly for the middle classes. Thanks to this new focus, the circulation of Pestrý týden increased to  hundreds of thousands of copies in a short time and it was able to establish itself against considerable competition from other First Republic periodicals Pražský ilustrovaný zpravodaj, Letem světem, Světozor, Ahoj, Star, Světový zdroj zábavy, Eva, Hvězda československých paní a dívek and List paní a dívek.

Zenith 
Pestrý týden’s peak years were 1938 - 1939 during which its "flawless gravure printing, as well as comprehensive articles and columns from home and abroad" made it qualitatively the equal of contemporaneous world weekly picture magazines.  During a tense period in Czech history it excelled in printed picture reportage by top Czech photographers to an extent unprecedented in competing papers.

During the Protectorate 
From 1940, Pestrý týden was the official organ of Radosti ze života (‘Joy of Life’), the sole socio-political movement in the Protectorate, Národního souručenství. The period marks a gradual decline in quality. Under the Nazi protectorate, Pestrý týden diverged from its news function, with the exception of ideologically distorted  news from Germany, and instead covered less topical, more general, stories; publisher and editor-in-chief Karel Neubert, did his best not promote Nazi ideology more than he was forced by the authorities.

Cessation 
Pestrý týden ceased publication just before the outbreak of the Prague uprising in 1945. In less than a month, the former editors formed a new news weekly called Svět v obrazech (‘The World in Pictures’).

Prominent photographers who contributed to Pestrý týden

Bibliography 
 Vilgus, Petr: České ilustrované časopisy mezi roky 1918–1945 na příkladu Pražského ilustrovaného zpravodaje a Pestrého týdne, Praha 2007. available online.
 Vilgus, Petr: Pestrý týden, 2. listopadu 1926 – 28. dubna 1945 : Vznik, existence a zánik nejlepšího ilustrovaného týdeníku první a druhé Československé republiky an období Protektorátu Čechy a Morava, Praha-Opava 2001, . available online.

References

External links 
 Digitised copies of Pestrý týden at Digitální knihovně

Magazines published in Czechoslovakia
Weekly magazines
1926 establishments in Czechoslovakia
1945 disestablishments in Czechoslovakia